Michoacán Nahuatl is the name given to a variety of Nahuatl language spoken by the Nahua Michoacan on the Pacific Coast of Mexico in Michoacán. It is a dialect of Nahuatl, a language of the Uto-Aztecan family. It is the westernmost variant of this language, although the Uto-Aztecan family is spread farther north, central, south and east. It has around 9000 speakers which mainly reside in rural communities in the municipalities of Aquila, Apatzingán Pomaro and Maruata in Michoacán de Ocampo, which coexist with the Purepecha language speakers. The Michoacan Nahuatl is one of many Nahua dialects, notably with regard to the central dialects which include tl in certain words, usually Michoacan. For example, the word for "man" in Central Nahuatl is tlacatl, whereas in Michoacan Nahuatl it is lacal.

References

Indigenous languages of Mexico
Nahuan languages
Nahuatl